Blackout is a podcast produced by QCode and Endeavor Audio and starring Rami Malek and Aja Naomi King. The show has 2 seasons currently released and has been renewed for a third season.

History
Blackout was the first podcast produced and released by QCode

Background 
The podcast was produced by QCode and Endeavor Audio. Blackout was the first podcast produced by QCode. The podcast was written by Scott Conroy. The podcast debuted on March 19, 2019. The first season of the podcast contains eight episodes. The second season stars Rami Malek and Aja Naomi King. The podcast was sponsered by Sonos. The story is set in a New England town called Berlin. The show follows a radio DJ named Simon Itani. The series explores what it would be like if modern technology was rendered useless. The show is an apocalyptic thriller. The A.V. Club called Rami's acting the "Best Celebrity Voice Work" in a 2019 podcast.

Cast and characters 

 Rami Malek as Simon Itani
 T. C. Carter as Hunter Itani
 Aja Naomi King

References 

Audio podcasts
2019 podcast debuts
2021 podcast endings
Scripted podcasts
Horror podcasts
Thriller podcasts